Alpha Hydri, Latinized from α Hydri, is the second brightest star in the southern circumpolar constellation of Hydrus. It is readily visible to the naked eye with an apparent visual magnitude of +2.9. It is sometimes informally known as the Head of Hydrus. This should not be confused with Alpha Hydrae (Alphard) in the constellation Hydra. Alpha Hydri is one of only three stars in the constellation Hydrus that are above the fourth visual magnitude. This star can be readily located as it lies to the south and east of the prominent star Achernar in the constellation Eridanus.

This subgiant star is three times larger and twice as massive as the Sun, with a stellar classification of F0 IV. It is about 810 million years old and is radiating 21 times the Sun's luminosity from its outer atmosphere at an effective temperature of 7,087 K. Alpha Hydri emits X-rays similar to Altair. The space velocity components of this star are [U, V, W] = .

Naming

References

F-type subgiants
Hydrus (constellation)
Hydri, Alpha
Durchmusterung objects
0083
012311
009236
0591